Banbury Road is a major arterial road in Oxford, England, running from St Giles' at the south end, north towards Banbury through the leafy suburb of North Oxford and Summertown, with its local shopping centre. Parallel and to the west is the Woodstock Road, which it meets at the junction with St Giles'. To the north, Banbury Road meets the Oxford Ring Road at a roundabout. The road is designated the A4165 (which continues for a short distance as Oxford Road to Kidlington). Prior to the building of the M40 motorway extension in 1990, the road formed part of the A423 from Maidenhead to Coventry.



Buildings

The former Mathematical Institute of Oxford University is at the lower end of the road on the east side. Opposite Keble Road is St Giles' Church, built in 1120 and consecrated in 1200. Further north are the Denys Wilkinson Building (astrophysics) and the prominent 1960s Thom Building of the Engineering Science department.

One of the university's former women's colleges, St Anne's College backs onto Banbury Road and another, St Hugh's College, flanks the road further up. Kellogg College and Wycliffe Hall, which are also part of the university are situated on Banbury Road, near to the junction with Bevington Road. The Independent Sixth Form of d'Overbroeck's College is housed in both the Swan Building at 111 and the adjacent number 113 which was, by the turn of the 20th century, occupied by a Mr R. Lamb Abbott MA who advertised for students to take instruction in "a course of lectures" over four weeks or so to enable them to sit their responsions and thus matriculate at the university.

Wychwood School, an independent girls' school, is at 74 Banbury Road. Established in 1897 as Miss Batty's School for the daughters of Oxford dons, from 1898 to 1907, the school was housed at 77 Banbury Road –  a "charming Regency house" – where residents Miss A.S. Batty and Miss Margaret Lee MA taught a handful of day girls. Miss Lee would later acquire ownership of number 77.  The school at that time also provided accommodation for young women sitting examinations who were members of the Society of Oxford Home Students – later St Anne's College, Oxford where Miss Lee tutored from 1913 to 1936. 77 Banbury Road was religious in nature: Miss Batty had an academic interest in religious matters and Miss Lee was the granddaughter of an Anglican vicar.

Banbury Road Medical Centre is a National Health Service facility at 172 Banbury Road.

BBC Oxford is also based on Banbury Road and is home to the local televised news output and BBC Radio Oxford. In early 1970 the BBC Oxford studios were actually located further down at 242–254 Banbury Road (now a branch of Marks & Spencer), but were later moved to 269 in 1989 as local media services within BBC Oxford expanded.

People
Famous residents include the lexicographer James Murray who produced the first Oxford English Dictionary (a blue plaque now marks the site) and the zoologist Desmond Morris, author of The Naked Ape.

The artist Paul Nash (1889–1946) lived at 106 Banbury Road, marked with an Oxfordshire Blue Plaque.

Jesse Elliston, the proprietor of what became Oxford's leading department store, Elliston & Cavell, died in the Banbury Road in 1853 at the age of only 47.

Dame Honor Fell DBE, FRS (1900–1986) studied at Wychwood School and this is commemorated with a blue plaque from the Society of Biology, installed in 2015.

Christopher Strachey (1916–1975) founded and led the Programming Research Group (part of Oxford University) from 1965 until his untimely death, at 45 Banbury Road. From 1977, the PRG was then led by Tony Hoare, located here until 1984.

Adjoining roads in North Oxford

 Bardwell Road
 Beech Croft Road
 Belbroughton Road
 Bevington Road
 Canterbury Road
 Five Mile Drive
 Keble Road
 Lathbury Road
 Linton Road
 Lonsdale Road
 Marston Ferry Road
 Moreton Road
 Norham Gardens
 Norham Road
 North Parade
 Park Town
 Parks Road
 Rawlinson Road
 South Parade
 Staverton Road
 St Giles'
 St Margaret's Road
 Victoria Road
 Woodstock Road

Gallery

See also
 Acland Hospital
 Norham Manor estate

References

Bibliography
 Hinchcliffe, Tanis, North Oxford. New Haven & London: Yale University Press, 1992. .

Streets in Oxford
Roads in Oxfordshire
Kellogg College, Oxford
St Anne's College, Oxford
St Hugh's College, Oxford
Wycliffe Hall, Oxford